Aejang of Silla (788–809) (r. 800–809) was the 40th ruler of the Korean kingdom of Silla.  He was the eldest son of King Soseong and Queen Gyehwa.  He married a lady of the Pak clan.  

In 802, Aejang had the great temple of Haeinsa built on Gayasan.  In 803, he formed an alliance with Wa.  In 806, he forbade the building of new temples.  In 809, he was slain along with his brother Chemyeong by his uncle Kim Eon-seung, who had been regent and took the throne for himself.

Family 

 Grandfather: Prince Hyechung (혜충태자) (750–791/792), posthumously named King Hyechung (혜충왕
 Grandmother: Queen Seongmok, of the Kim clan ( 성목태후 김씨)
 Father: Soseong of Silla
 Mother: Queen Gyehwa, of the Kim clan (계화부인 김씨)
 Wife:
Queen Park, of the Park clan ( 왕후 박씨)

See also
Unified Silla
List of Korean monarchs
List of Silla people

References

Silla rulers
788 births
809 deaths
9th-century Korean monarchs